DWU may refer to

Ashland Regional Airport (FAA identifier: DWU)
Dakota Wesleyan University
Dallas Water Utilities
Divine Word University
Divine Word University of Tacloban
Dominion Wrestling Union
Dongduk Women's University